The 1907 Iowa Hawkeyes football team represented the University of Iowa as a member of the Missouri Valley Conference (MVC) and the Western Conference during the 1907 college football season. Led by second-year head coach Mark Catlin Sr., the Hawkeyes compiled an overall record of 3–2 with a mark of 1–0 in MVC play, sharing the MVC title with Nebraska. Iowa was 1–1 against Western Conference opponents, placing fourth in that conference.

Schedule

References

Iowa
Iowa
Iowa Hawkeyes football seasons
Missouri Valley Conference football champion seasons
Iowa Hawkeyes football